Railing or railings may refer to:

 Railings (horse), a racehorse
 Guard rail, a structure blocking an area from access
 Cable railings, a type of guard rail
 Handrail, a structure designed to provide support on or near a staircase
 Grab bar, a structure to provide support elsewhere, for instance in a bathroom or kitchen
 Insufflation (medicine), the act of inhaling a substance, generally a drug
 "Railing," a song by Roni Size & Reprazent from their album New Forms